Wisconsin Club for Growth is a 501(c)(4) nonprofit organization based in Wisconsin. It financially supported Wisconsin Governor Scott Walker during the recall election in 2012. It had $8 million in revenue in 2012.

Governance
Director, Eric O'Keefe 
Director and spokesman, R.J. Johnson who also worked on Walker's 2010 and 2012 campaigns
Treasurer, Valerie Johnson, wife of R.J. Johnson.

Funds disbursed
These are among funds given:
2011, $4.2 million to Citizens for a Strong America Treasurer, Valerie Johnson, and director, John Connors.
$450,000 to the Austin, Texas-based Alliance for Self-Governance, an inactive tax-exempt operation launched by Wisconsin Club for Growth director Eric O’Keefe.
$250,000 to the Washington, D.C.-based voucher group American Federation for Children
$2.9 million to the political arm of the Wisconsin Manufacturers and Commerce

Donations received
These are among donations received:
1,500,000 dollars from John Menard Jr.
1,000,000 dollars from Stephen Cohen, the founder of SAC Capitol Advisors
700,000 dollars from Gogebic Taconite LLC, owned by Chris Cline
250,000 dollars fromQ hedge fund CEO Paul Singer
100,000 dollars from manufacturer Maclean-Fogg Co
50,000 dollars donation from Atlanticus Holdings CEO David Hanna's trust. Hanna is a controversial figure. He was recruited by and served as a false elector recruited by the head of the Georgia Republican Party, David Shafer to support Donald Trump's failed effort to subvert the results of the 2020 presidential election.  https://georgiarecorder.com/2022/02/01/trumps-fake-electors-heres-the-full-list/
50,000 dollars from hedge fund chairman Bruce Kovner
$50,000 from natural gas and oil producer Devon Energy
$15,000 from Home Depot co-founder Ken Langone and 
$15,000 from Donald Trump
50,000 dollars from Richard Colburn, vice-president of Consolidated Electrical Distributors
25,000 dollars from Keith Colburn, president of Consolidated Electrical Distributors

See also
Club for Growth
2011 Wisconsin protests
2011 Wisconsin Act 10
Wisconsin Economic Development Corporation
Dark money
Money loop

References

United States political action committees
501(c)(4) nonprofit organizations
Non-profit organizations based in Wisconsin